Stigmella dorsiguttella is a moth of the family Nepticulidae. It is widespread but very local in central, eastern and southern Europe and south-western Asia. It has been recorded from south-eastern Sweden, Germany, Poland, the Czech Republic, Slovakia, Austria, France, Portugal, Spain, Italy, Slovenia, Croatia, Ukraine, Greece and Turkey.

The wingspan is 5–6 mm. Adults are on wing from May to September. There is one generation in the north of its range. There are probably two generations in the south.

The larvae feed on Quercus petraea and Quercus robur. They mine the leaves of their host plant. The mine consists of a fairly broad corridor. The frass is concentrated in a narrow central line, except towards the end.

External links
Fauna Europaea
bladmineerders.nl
The Quercus Feeding Stigmella Species Of The West Palaearctic: New Species, Key And Distribution (Lepidoptera: Nepticulidae)

Nepticulidae
Moths of Europe
Moths of Asia
Moths described in 1971